Kathleen Margaret Graham  (1913–2008) was a Canadian abstract impressionist artist known for depicting colors and patterns she found in nature. She is known for becoming a painter at the age of 50, after her husband, Dr. Wallace Graham, died in 1962.

Early life and education 
Graham was born in Hamilton, Ontario, in 1913. She graduated from Trinity College at the University of Toronto with a degree in home economics in 1936. She never received a formal education or training in art.

Art career 
Graham was a museum docent at the Art Gallery of Toronto, where she became familiar with works by Piet Mondrian and American color field painters. During travels with her husband, she visited art galleries and museums, developing her love of art. 

Encouraged by Jack Bush to paint,  Graham had her first solo art exhibition in Toronto in 1967, at the Carmen Lamanna Gallery. In 1971, after visiting Cape Dorset in the Canadian Arctic, she shifted her focus to depicting the region's landscape. In 1976, she became an artist in residence in Cape Dorset, going on to introduce acrylic paints to Inuit artists. One critic described her paintings as "playful, expansive, and unpretentious".

Recognition 
Graham's paintings are part of the permanent collections at the National Gallery of Canada, the Art Gallery of Ontario, the McMichael Canadian Art Collection, and the British Museum. Graham's bequest of books has been turned into an art reference browsing collection within the John W. Graham library at Trinity College.

Graham was a member of the Royal Canadian Academy of Arts and exhibited alongside her peers. She showed her work across North America and Europe. In 1998, Graham was made an honourary fellow of Trinity College.

Personal life 
After her marriage to Dr. Wallace Graham, in 1938, Graham spent the next several years raising their two children. Having always been inspired by nature, Graham continued canoeing, swimming, writing, and painting until she was 92. Graham died on August 26, 2008, in Toronto, at the age of 94 and suffering from Alzheimer's disease.

References 

1913 births
2008 deaths
20th-century Canadian painters
20th-century Canadian women artists
Artists from Hamilton, Ontario
University of Toronto alumni
Trinity College (Canada) alumni
Members of the Royal Canadian Academy of Arts
Canadian women painters